2009 U-League is second season for university football teams. The participated team is expanded to 22 university football teams in South Korea. The season began on 9 April 2009, and ended on 26 November 2009.

Participating teams (2009)

North
Chungbuk National University
Dankook University
Halla University
Hoseo University
Kwandong University
Sangji University
Yong-In University

Metropolitan
Chung-Ang University
Hanyang University
Korea University
Kyunghee University
Yonsei University
Myongji University
Seoul National University
University of Suwon

South
Hannam University
Honam University
Jeonju University
Yeungnam University
Pai Chai University
University of Ulsan
Woosuk University

League standing

Northern League

Metropolitan League

Southern League

Results

Northern League

Metropolitan League

Southern League

Playoff

Winner

Awards
 Fair Play Team : Kyunghee University
 Most Valuable Player : Bae Il-Hwan (Dankook University)
 Valuable Player : Park Joon-Hyuk (Jeonju University)
 Fair Play Player : Kang Kyung-Koo (Jeonju University)
 Top Goalscorer : Ko Kyung-Min (Hanyang University)
 Best Defender : Jung Ji-Hoon (Dankook University)
 Best Goalkeeper : Lee Jin-Hyung (Dankook University)
 Best Assistor : Park Dae-Song (Chungbuk National University)
 Best Manager : Shin Yeon-Ho (Dankook University)
 Best Coach : Park Jong-Kwan (Dankook University)

U-League (association football)